McEniff is a surname. Notable people with the surname include:

Brian McEniff (born 1942), Irish Gaelic footballer, administrator, and manager
Sean McEniff (1936–2017), Irish businessman and politician
Terry McEniff, Irish businessman and politician